Maryam Hassani (born 8 October 1993) is a Bahraini sports shooter. She competed in the women's skeet event at the 2020 Summer Olympics.

References

External links
 

1993 births
Living people
Bahraini female sport shooters
Olympic shooters of Bahrain
Shooters at the 2020 Summer Olympics
People from Muharraq
Shooters at the 2018 Asian Games